The Arch of Augustus is a gate in the former city wall of Rimini, Italy. The arch was dedicated to the Emperor Augustus by the Roman Senate in 27 BC and is one of the oldest Roman arches which survives to this day. It signaled the end of the via Flaminia, which connected the cities of Romagna to Rome, and spans the modern Corso d'Augusto (the ancient decumanus maximus), which led to the beginning of another road, the via Emilia, which ran northwest to Piacenza.

Appearance
Its style is simple, but solemn. The arch, which is of exceptional size, is flanked by two engaged columns with fluted shafts and Corinthian capitals. The four clipei (shields) placed next to the capitals each depict Roman divinities: Jupiter and Apollo on the Roman side, Neptune and Roma facing the city of Rimini.

The gate supported a lavish bronze statue of Augustus, depicted driving a quadriga.

The main peculiarity of this arch is that the archway is especially large for a gate of the time. The explanation is perhaps that the peaceful policy of Augustus, the so-called Pax Romana, made a civic gate that could be closed seem unnecessary, since there was no danger of attack.

History
The gate remained in use after antiquity with some modifications. The battlements (merlons) on the upper part date to the medieval period (10th century), at which time the city came to be held by the Ghibellines. The arch remained one of the city gates until the Fascist period, when the city wall was demolished and the arch was left as an isolated monument.

Along with the Bridge of Augustus and Tiberius, it is today one of the symbols of Rimini, so important that it appears on the city's coat of arms.

Inscription
The Latin inscription above the arch reads:

See also
 Arch of Augustus (disambiguation) for other such arches
 List of Roman triumphal arches

References

External links
 The Arch of Augustus on the website of the district

Rimini
Augustus